Matthew "Mackie" Samoskevich (born November 15, 2002) is an American collegiate ice hockey player for the University of Michigan of the Big Ten Conference (B1G). He was drafted 24th overall by the Florida Panthers in the 2021 NHL Entry Draft.

Playing career
During the 2020–21 season, Samoskevich recorded 13 goals and 24 assists in 36 games for the Chicago Steel. During the Clark Cup playoffs, he recorded one goal and nine assists in eight games to help lead his team to the Anderson Cup and Clark Cup.

Samoskevich began his collegiate career for the Michigan Wolverines during the 2021–22 season. During his freshman season, he recorded 26 points on nine goals and 17 assists. Two of his goals were unassisted goals, capitalizing on turnovers, while four goals came on the power play. Following an outstanding season, he was named to the All-Big Ten Freshman Team.

During the 2022–23 season in his sophomore year, Samoskevich ranked second on the team in goals with 19, and third in points with 40 in 35 games. Following the season, he was named to the All-Big Ten Second Team.

On July 23, 2021, Samoskevich was drafted 24th overall by the Florida Panthers in the 2021 NHL Entry Draft.

International play
Samoskevich represented the United States at the 2019 Hlinka Gretzky Cup, where he recorded one goal in four games.

Personal life
Samoskevich comes from a hockey-playing family.  His twin sister, Madison, plays college hockey for Quinnipiac, while his older sister, Melissa is a professional ice hockey player for the Connecticut Whale of the Premier Hockey Federation.

Career statistics

Regular season and playoffs

International

Awards and honours

References

External links
 

2002 births
Living people
American ice hockey centers
Chicago Steel players
Florida Panthers draft picks
Ice hockey players from Connecticut
Michigan Wolverines men's ice hockey players
National Hockey League first-round draft picks
People from Sandy Hook, Connecticut